The Battle of Marj al-Saffar took place in 634. At Damascus, Thomas, son-in-law of Byzantine Emperor Heraclius, was in charge. Receiving the intelligence of Khalid's march towards Damascus he prepared the defences of Damascus. He wrote to Emperor Heraclius for reinforcement, who was at Emesa that time. Moreover, Thomas, in order to get more time to prepare for a siege, sent the armies to delay, or if possible, halt Khalid's march to Damascus. One such army was defeated at the Battle of Yaqusa in mid-August 634 near Lake Tiberias 150 km from Damascus, another army that halted the Muslim advance to Damascus was defeated in the Battle of Marj al-Saffar on 19 August 634. It is said that Umm Hakim bint al-Harith ibn Hisham, a Muslim heroine was involved in this battle and killed seven Byzantine soldiers.

References

Sources

Muslim conquest of the Levant
Marj Al-Saffar
Marj al-Saffar
Marj al-Saffar